Marquis Xuan of Cai (蔡宣侯) (?–715 BC), born Ji Cuòfu  (姬措父), was the eleventh ruler of the State of Cai from 750 BC to 715 BC.  He was the only known son of Marquis Dai of Cai (蔡戴侯), his predecessor. His reign for 35 years. He was succeeded by his son.

References 
 Shiji
 Chinese Wikipedia
 
 

Zhou dynasty nobility
Cai (state)
8th-century BC Chinese monarchs